La Torre was an Argentine rock band, led by vocalist Patricia Sosa, and founded in Buenos Aires in 1981.

Career
The first line-up included Gustavo Giles (bass), Ricardo Giles (drums), Carlos García López (guitar), Oscar Mediavilla (guitar), Luis Múscolo (keyboards), and Patricia Sosa (singer). 
They recorded a first, self-titled LP for RCA Victor in 1982, and were featured at the BA Rock festival, in November 1982.

In 1983 the second album Viaje a la libertad showed a more rocking style, confirmed with the third LP, Sólo quiero rock & roll, from 1984.

With some line-up changes a fourth album was released in 1986, Presas de caza, featuring a radio-friendly pop metal sound.
The last effort, entitled Movimiento, was released by DG Discos in 1988, followed by a tour through the U.S.S.R., soon before disbandment.
The band finally broke up in 1989.

Discography 
La Torre (1982)
Viaje a la libertad (1983)
Sólo quiero rock & roll (1984)
Presas de caza (1986)
En vivo (Live, 1987)
Movimiento (1988)

Members 
Patricia Sosa : Vocals (1981-1990)
Oscar Mediavilla: Rhythm Guitar (1981-1990)
Carlos García López (†): Lead Guitar (1981- 1985)
Ricardo Giles: Drums (1981 - 1983)
Gustavo Giles: Bass (1981- 1982)
Jota Morelli: Drums (1983-1985)
Fernando Lupano: Bass (1982- 1987)
Luis Muscolo: Keyboards (1981- 1987)
Beto Topini: Drums (1986-1990)
Gady Pampillón: Lead Guitar (1986-1990)
Ricky Matut: Bass (1987- 1990)
Juan Forcada: Keyboards (1988-1990)

References

External links 

Argentine heavy metal musical groups
Musical groups established in 1981
Musical groups disestablished in 1989
Argentine rock music groups
Musical groups from Buenos Aires